The Old Harry oil field is an oil field in the Gulf of St. Lawrence off Newfoundland and Quebec.

References

Oil fields